The Six Mile Creek Dam (more commonly known as Lake MacDonald) is a rock and earth-fill embankment dam with an un-gated spillway across the Six Mile Creek that is located in the South East region of  Queensland, Australia. The main purposes of the dam are for potable water supply of the Sunshine Coast region and for recreation. The impounded reservoir is called Lake Macdonald, named in memory of former Noosa Shire Council Chairman Ian MacDonald.

Location and features
The primary inflow of the reservoir is Six Mile Creek.

The  dam wall holds back the  reservoir when at full capacity. Initially managed by the Sunshine Coast Regional Council, management of the dam was transferred to Seqwater in July 2008.

The dam reached its maximum recorded level of 1.97m over the spillway in February 2012.

In May 2019, Seqwater proposes to upgrade Six Mile Creek Dam (also known as Lake Macdonald Dam) as part of its Dam Improvement Program.

Recreational activities
Within proximity of the dam, horse riding, boating and canoeing are permitted. The Noosa Botanic Gardens are located on the northwestern shoreline of Lake Macdonald.

The reservoir is stocked with Mary River cod, bass, yellowbelly, saratoga and snub nosed gar with endemic populations of tandans (eel tailed catfish) and the introduced spangled perch. A stocked impoundment permit is required to fish in the dam.

See also

List of dams in Queensland

References

Macdonald, Lake
Dams completed in 1965
Sunshine Coast, Queensland
Dams in Queensland
1965 establishments in Australia
Embankment dams
Rock-filled dams
Earth-filled dams